Globe is a common name for daily newspapers:
Il Globo
O Globo
The Boston Globe, a daily newspaper published in Boston, Massachusetts, United States
The Globe and Mail, a daily newspaper published in Toronto, Canada
The Globe (Toronto newspaper), the oldest of the predecessors merged into it
Jakarta Globe, a daily newspaper published in Jakarta, Indonesia
Globe (tabloid), a supermarket tabloid newspaper published in New York City, United States
The Globe (Camp Lejeune), the newspaper of U.S. Marine Corps
Richmond Globe, a weekly newspaper published in Richmond, New York, United States
Le Globe, a defunct 19th century French newspaper
The Globe (London newspaper), a defunct British newspaper founded in 1803 and merged with the Pall Mall Gazette in 1921
The Globe (student newspaper), an independent student newspaper of Point Park University, Pittsburgh, Pennsylvania
The Globe (Sydney, N.S.W.: 1911–1914), a defunct daily newspaper published in Sydney, New South Wales, Australia
The New York Globe, a defunct daily newspaper published in New York, United States
The Washington Globe, a defunct semi-weekly newspaper published in Washington DC, United States
Globes, a daily financial newspaper published in Tel Aviv, Israel

Globe